Polymorphous low-grade adenocarcinoma (PLGA) is a rare, asymptomatic, slow-growing malignant salivary gland tumor. It is most commonly found in the palate.

The name of the tumor derives from the fact that:
It has a varied microscopic architectural appearance, i.e. it is polymorphous.
It is non-aggressive when compared to other oral cavity tumors, i.e. it is a low-grade tumor. 
It forms glands, i.e. it is an adenocarcinoma.
It affects the minor salivary glands in the area between the hard and the soft palate. Male to female ratio is 3:1, and the average age is 56 years.

Histology
PLGAs consist of a monomorphous cell population that has a varied histologic morphology.

Microscopically, its histology can be confused with an adenoid cystic carcinoma and a pleomorphic adenoma.

Treatment
PLGAs are treated with wide local surgical excision and long-term follow-up.
There is a recurrence rate of 14% (Peterson, contemporary of oral and maxillofacial surgery).

References 

Salivary gland neoplasia